The Woden Cemetery is the main cemetery in Canberra, the capital of Australia. It is located adjacent to the Woden Town Centre.

The cemetery opened in 1936 as the Canberra General Cemetery.

It closed for burials in 1979, but was re-opened in March 1999. Memorial gardens were opened in 1992, and the Christ the Redeemer Mausoleum, for burial in above-ground vaults, was completed in 2001.

The cemetery is nearing capacity; it was announced in February 2009 that it would be full in about 10 years, necessitating the construction of a third cemetery to service the city.

Notable burials
 Ernest Albert Corey distinguished Australian soldier
 John Treloar OBE museum administrator
 Lewis Nott politician
 Francis Patrick Dwyer distinguished scientist
 Gordon Upton AO diplomat
 George Knowles CBE diplomat
 Robert Strachan Wallace Vice-Chancellor of the University of Sydney
 Herbert Vere Evatt Federal Leader of the Australian Labor Party, Justice of the Australian High Court, Chief Justice of New South Wales and President of the General Assembly of the United Nations

War graves
It contains the war graves of 30 Australian service personnel of World War II – 10 soldiers and 20 airmen.

References 

Cemeteries in the Australian Capital Territory
Landmarks in Canberra
Australian Capital Territory Heritage Register